The Museum für Vor- und Frühgeschichte ("Museum for prehistory and early history"), part of the Berlin State Museums, is one of major archaeological museums of Germany, and among the largest supra-regional collections of prehistoric finds in Europe. It was previously located in the former theatre building by Carl Ferdinand Langhans, next to Schloss Charlottenburg, and encompasses six exhibition halls on three floors. Since October 2009, the museum's exhibitions are now displayed in the Neues Museum on Museum Island.

Apart from  a permanent exhibition, it regularly houses temporary exhibits. Attached to the museum is a specialised library on prehistoric archaeology with over 50,000 volumes. Furthermore, the museum houses the Commission for the exploration of archaeological collections and documents from northeast Central Europe, a project for the study of ancient Egyptian calendars, and a number of other bodies.

History 

The collection goes back to the Cabinet of curiosities and later art collection of the Hohenzollern who assembled an initial collection of ancient finds from 1830 onwards in Schloss Monbijou under the name "Museum Vaterländischer Altertümer" (Museum of National Antiquities). Later, the collection moved first to the Neues Museum, then, in 1886, to the Ethnographic Museum (Prinz-Albrecht-Strasse) and in 1921 into the Martin-Gropius-Bau, where it was renamed "Staatliches Museum für Vor- und Frühgeschichte" in 1931. The museum's financial supporters and contributors of material included Rudolf Virchow and Heinrich Schliemann.

After World War II, parts of the collections were confiscated by the Soviet Union.

The Museum moved to Schloss Charlottenburg (then West Berlin) in 1960. After German reunification, the collection of the East Berlin "Museum für Vor- und Frühgeschichte " was incorporated.

Exhibition halls 
The museum visit takes the form of a circuit walk. It includes the following rooms:

Rudolf-Virchow-Studio 
The Rudolf-Virchow-Studio (Room 1) contains an overview of the technological history of the Stone Age, Bronze Age and Iron Age. It also contains PCs with interactive displays and a lecture hall.

Schliemann-Saal 
Der Schliemann-Saal (Room 2) houses bronze and Iron Age finds from the Mediterranean, West and Central Asia and China. It also contains a collection of Cypriot antiquities of international rank.

Stone Age and Bronze Age room 
The Stone Age and Bronze Age room (Room 3) shows European finds from those periods. The displays include finds from the Palaeolithic sites of Combe-Capelle and Le Moustier, Ice Age art and the development of Palaeolithic and Mesolithic tools. It also presents the Neolithic cultures of Europe from Linear Pottery to Bell beaker. The Bronze Age collection includes material illustrating the development of metallurgy, of cult and of funerarary habits. The geographic range extends from Western Europe to Northern Germany and Scandinavia, but also to East Central Europe, the Alps and Danube region and even Northern Italy.

Goldsaal 

The Gold Room (Room 4) contains precious individual finds of Bronze Age metal (the Berlin Gold Hat, though, is now part of the Neues Museum, which was reopened in 2009).

Saal 5 
Room 5 is devoted to the period from the early Iron Age to the Middle Ages. It begins with finds from the Hallstatt culture of the Alps and the Sticna cuirass, followed by Celtic, Germanic and Roman material. The Middle Ages are documented through the exhibition of coins, clothing, weaponry, and other finds.

References

External links

 Staatliche Museen zu Berlin: Museum für Vor- und Frühgeschichte

 
Museums in Berlin
Archaeological museums in Germany
Buildings and structures in Charlottenburg-Wilmersdorf
Museums established in 1830
1830 establishments in Prussia
Berlin State Museums